Señorita Panamá 2006 the 24th Annual Señorita Panamá pageant and 41st celebration of the Miss Panama contest, was held in the Gran Salón del Hotel & Casino Venetto, Panama City, Panama Wednesday 15, July 2006.

About 9 contestants from all over Panamá competed for the prestigious crown. Señorita Panamá World 2005, Anna Vaprio Medaglia of Panamá Centro crowned to Giselle Bissot of Panamá Centro as the new Señorita Panamá.  This year the final only selected Señorita Panamá for Miss World.

The requirements of selection of the competitors for this year were: to be a model and have experience in beauty contests, since it needed to be a woman who was already prepared in advance. Contestants had taken part in: Miss Panama, Miss Hawaiian Tropic Panamá and Miss International Panama.

Bissot competed in the 56th edition of the Miss World 2006 pageant, was held at the Palace of Culture and Science in, Warsaw, Poland on September 30, 2006. Bissot declined her participation in Miss Universe due to her studies. Matos competed in the 56th Miss Universe pageant, held on 28 May 2007 at the National Auditorium in Mexico City, Mexico.

Final result

Special awards

Others special awards

Contestants 
These are the competitors who have been selected this year.

Historical significance

Panamá Centro placed in the final round for consecutive year and won the title Miss World Panamá.

Election Schedule

Friday July 10 final presentation to the press in the Hotel Radisson Decapolis.
Tuesday July 14 competition of interview with the juror.
Wednesday 23 Final night, coronation Señorita Panamá to Miss World 2006

Candidates Notes
Giselle Bissot In 1998 it took part Chica & Chico Modelo. In 2003 stayed of the first finalist in Señorita Panamá. In 2005 it went to Miss Asia Pacificic International in China, Also it took part in the Miss Mesoamérica, which was realized in Houston, where it occupied the fourth place.
Sorangel Matos Arce represent Panamá in Miss Universe 2007 in Mexico City.

References

External links
  Señorita Panamá  official website

Señorita Panamá
2006 beauty pageants